Mallard Lake is a 104 acre lake in Clearwater County, Minnesota, in the United States.

Mallard Lake was named from its large population of mallard ducks. The lake has a reported maximum depth of 17 feet.

See also
List of lakes in Minnesota

References

Lakes of Minnesota
Lakes of Clearwater County, Minnesota